Pål Bjarne Tyldum (born 28 March 1942) is a retired cross-country skier from Norway. Specializing in the longer distances, he won a gold medal in the 50 km event at the 1972 Winter Olympics in Sapporo. At the 1968 Winter Olympics in Grenoble, he won a gold medal in the 4 × 10 km relay. Additionally, he won three Olympic silver medals and seven national cross-country championships. His best result at the world championships was fourth place in the 30 km and 4 × 10 km relay in 1970.

Tyldum won the 50 km event at the Holmenkollen ski festival twice (1969 and 1972). He received the Holmenkollen medal in 1970 and the Sir Thomas Fearnley Cup from the Norwegian Olympic Committee in 1972. He was selected as the Olympic flag bearer for Norway at the 1976 Winter Olympics.

Life 

Tyldum grew up in a rural area and in his early years worked as a forester and a surveyor. His brothers Jon, Svein, Kjell and Gunnar were also cross-country skiers, and often competed as a team at the national championships. After retiring from competitions Tyldum returned to his birthplace and became a farmer.

Cross-country skiing results
All results are sourced from the International Ski Federation (FIS).

Olympic Games
 5 medals – (2 gold, 3 silver)

World Championships

References

External links

 
 Holmenkollen medalists - click Holmenkollmedaljen for downloadable pdf file 
 Holmenkollen winners since 1892 - click Vinnere for downloadable pdf file 

1942 births
Cross-country skiers at the 1968 Winter Olympics
Cross-country skiers at the 1972 Winter Olympics
Cross-country skiers at the 1976 Winter Olympics
Holmenkollen medalists
Holmenkollen Ski Festival winners
Living people
Norwegian male cross-country skiers
Olympic cross-country skiers of Norway
Olympic gold medalists for Norway
Olympic silver medalists for Norway
Olympic medalists in cross-country skiing
Medalists at the 1976 Winter Olympics
Medalists at the 1972 Winter Olympics
Medalists at the 1968 Winter Olympics